"Still Real" is a song from Australian alternative rock group, George. It was released as the lead and only single taken from their second studio album Unity (2004).

Track listing
CD single (021622)
 "Still Real" (album version) – 4:27
 "Quiet Heart" (with The Go-Betweens) – 5:29
 "Man Overboard" (with Deborah Conway) – 4:10
 "Still Real" (Radio edit) – 4:03

 "Still Real" (CD-ROM video clip)

Personnel
 Benjamin Portas – artwork
 Paulie B – bass, guitar
 Geoff Green – drums, percussion
 Justin Tresidder – additional engineer (tracks 1 to 3)
 Paul Pilsneniks – assistant engineer (track 1)
 Evan McHugh – assistant engineer (tracks 2 and 3)
 Nick Stewart – guitar
 Katie Noonan – vocals, keyboards
 Tyrone Noonan – vocals, keyboards, guitar

Charts

References

George (band) songs
2003 songs
2003 singles